Marek Krzysztof Wójcik (born 24 March 1980 in Katowice) is a Polish politician. He was elected to the Sejm on 25 September 2005, getting 4408 votes in 31 Katowice district as a candidate from the Civic Platform list.

See also
Members of Polish Sejm 2005-2007

External links
Marek Wójcik - parliamentary page - includes declarations of interest, voting record, and transcripts of speeches.

Members of the Polish Sejm 2005–2007
Civic Platform politicians
1980 births
Living people
Politicians from Katowice
Members of the Polish Sejm 2007–2011
Members of the Polish Sejm 2011–2015